Claughton is a civil parish in Lancaster, Lancashire, England. It contains nine listed buildings that are recorded in the National Heritage List for England.  Of these, one is listed at Grade I, the highest of the three grades, one is at Grade II*, the middle grade, and the others are at Grade II, the lowest grade.  The parish contains the village of Claughton, and is otherwise rural.  Its major structure is Claughton Hall, a country house that was moved from its original site in the village to a more isolated position in 1932–35.  The hall is listed, and the other listed buildings include a former wing of the hall that is now a farmhouse, other houses, a barn, a church, a cross base in the churchyard, and a milestone.

Key

Buildings

References

Citations

Sources

Lists of listed buildings in Lancashire
Buildings and structures in the City of Lancaster